Leonardo Benjamín Rayo Nordetti (born 24 November 1992) is a Chilean former professional footballer. He played as a goalkeeper.

Post-retirement
He became a futsal player, representing Coquimbo Unido.

References

External links
 
 
 Leonardo Rayo at HKFA

1992 births
Living people
Chilean people of Italian descent
Footballers from Santiago
Chilean footballers
Chile youth international footballers
Chilean expatriate footballers
Colo-Colo footballers
Sham Shui Po SA players
Colo-Colo B footballers
Coquimbo Unido footballers
Trasandino footballers
Lota Schwager footballers
Deportes Colina footballers
Chilean Primera División players
Hong Kong First Division League players
Segunda División Profesional de Chile players
Primera B de Chile players
Chilean expatriate sportspeople in Hong Kong
Expatriate footballers in Hong Kong
Association football goalkeepers